The Monastery of St. Michael , on the Heiligenberg (Saints' Mountain) in Heidelberg, was a branch of the nearby Lorsch Abbey. The ruined complex that can be seen today was built beginning in 1023. The monastery was occupied successively by several religious orders before it was abandoned in the 16th century.

The first mention of the monastery is in the Lorsch codex, from the 12th century, which dates the founding of the monastery to 870. No remains of an earlier monastery have been found, so this might have been merely an estimate of the founding.

References
Wilhelm Schleuning: Die Michaels-Basilika auf dem heiligen Berg bei Heidelberg. Eine baugeschichtliche Studie. Heidelberg, 1887.  
Bert Burger: Klosterruine St. Michael auf dem Heiligenberg. Beginn der Ausgrabungen durch Wilhelm Schleuning 1886, in: Jahrbuch des Stadtteilvereins Handschuhsheim 2006, S. 47-52
Eckhard Spatz: Das Michaelskloster - Benediktiner auf dem Heiligenberg : Lichtbilderreihe / Hrsg. vom Landratsamt Rhein-Neckar-Kreis, Bildstelle Heidelberg, 1990.

External links 

 Rekonstruktionsmodell der Klosterkirche St. Michael

Buildings and structures in Heidelberg
Ruined abbeys and monasteries
Ruins in Germany
Tourist attractions in Heidelberg